Eaton Rapids is a city in Eaton County in the U.S. state of Michigan.  The population was 5,214 at the 2010 census.

The city is located in the south of Eaton Rapids Township, on the boundary with Hamlin Township, though it is politically independent of both townships.  Its nickname is the Island City, since the downtown is located on an island, with a public park, in the Grand River.

History 

The Potawatomi people established a village in the area of what is now Eaton Rapids in about 1774. This was part of their wide territory in historic times.

The area constituting Eaton Rapids was first settled by Euro-Americans around the year 1835, who were drawn there because of the timber and water power in the area. It became a center of industry. The following year, a sawmill was constructed near Spring Brook in Spicerville; it provided the lumber settlers used to build Eaton Rapids. In 1837, the Old Red Mill was constructed by the mill company; it used waterpower from the stream to grind corn. The mill company later used wood from Spicerville to construct their own sawmill along the Grand River, as well as a wool carding mill.

In 1852, mineral water was first discovered by E. B. Frost, earning Eaton Rapids worldwide fame and the nickname The Saratoga of the West, referring to Saratoga Springs, New York, which had tourism based on such waters. This water was in huge demand, and resulted in many people coming to take mineral water baths, considered to have health benefits, as well as cures from specific ailments. Fourteen wells were drilled in total to supply water for the baths. Only three are still operational. 

In 1921, John B. Davidson Sr. came to Eaton Rapids from Philadelphia, Pennsylvania. He started the only textile mill in Michigan that spun its own yarn. The Davidson Mill supplied 95 percent of the wool yarn for major league baseball uniforms, as well as high-grade yarns for other applications. After 48 years in business, the mill burned in 1969. John B. Davidson became a politician, elected as mayor of Eaton Rapids, and later representing the area in both the State House and State Senate.

In 1927, Irving Jacob Reuter and his wife Janet built Medovue, a 17-room, 10,000-square foot, Tudor Revival- style mansion, where they lived for nine years.  President of the Oldsmobile automobile company, Reuter was also a financier and inventor.  The Reuters donated substantial sums to charity.

Their property was sold to the Roman Catholic Diocese of Lansing, and became the private residence of its first Bishop, the Most Reverend Joseph H. Albers. The diocese later sold the mansion. 

It was purchased by C.J. and Mille Sumner, who adapted it and reopened it to operate as an Adult Foster Care Home. They furnished it with antiques and named it "Ivy Manor".  The home was sold again in 1990 and was renovated for use as a bed and breakfast, known as the English Inn.  In 1991 it was recognized and listed in the state List of Registered Historic Places in Michigan.  The original  building, complete with many of the original antique furnishings, has  of gardens and pastoral countryside located on the river. It was purchased by Gary and Donna Nelson in 1996, who also developed a restaurant and pub on the property. It is open to the public for viewing. Their son Erik Nelson has taken over operations.

Geography 

Eaton Rapids is on the northward course of the Grand River as it flows from Jackson to Lansing. There it turns westward at its confluence with the Spring Brook.

Geographic features 

Grand River

Transportation 

 connects with I-69, nine miles (14 km) west in Charlotte; and with US 127 and I-94,  to the southeast just north of Jackson.
 provides access from Eaton Rapids to the Veterans of Foreign Wars (VFW) National Home near Onondaga.

Demographics

2010 census
As of the census of 2010, there were 5,214 people, 2,092 households, and 1,345 families residing in the city. The racial makeup of the city was 95.1% White, 0.7% African American, 0.4% Native American, 0.5% Asian, 0.8% from other races, and 2.6% from two or more races. Hispanic or Latino of any race were 4.4% of the population.

There were 2,092 households, of which 36.9% had children under the age of 18 living with them, 42.1% were married couples living together, 15.3% had a female householder with no husband present, 6.8% had a male householder with no wife present, and 35.7% were non-families. Of all households, 30.0% were made up of individuals, and 11% had someone living alone who was 65 years of age or older. The average household size was 2.49 and the average family size was 3.09.

The median age in the city was 34.8 years. 27.7% of residents were under the age of 18; 9.3% were between the ages of 18 and 24; 26.7% were from 25 to 44; 25.2% were from 45 to 64; and 11.1% were 65 years of age or older. The gender makeup of the city was 48.3% male and 51.7% female.

2000 census
As of the census of 2000, there were 5,330 people, 2,067 households, and 1,399 families residing in the city. The racial makeup of the city was 96.12% White, 0.38% African American, 0.45% Native American, 0.54% Asian, 1.01% from other races, and 1.50% from two or more races. Hispanic or Latino of any race were 2.93% of the population.

There were 2,067 households, out of which 39.7% had children under the age of 18 living with them, 47.8% were married couples living together, 13.9% had a female householder with no husband present, and 32.3% were non-families. Of all households 27.4% were made up of individuals, and 12.2% had someone living alone who was 65 years of age or older.  The average household size was 2.57 and the average family size was 3.11.

In the city, the population was spread out, with 31.0% under the age of 18, 8.9% from 18 to 24, 30.7% from 25 to 44, 18.2% from 45 to 64, and 11.2% who were 65 years of age or older.  The median age was 32 years. For every 100 females, there were 92.6 males.  For every 100 females age 18 and over, there were 87.9 males.

The median income for a household in the city was $39,769, and the median income for a family was $48,239. Males had a median income of $37,582 versus $29,440 for females. The per capita income for the city was $18,446.  About 3.2% of families and 5.9% of the population were below the poverty line, including 6.3% of those under age 18 and 2.1% of those age 65 or over.

Climate
This climatic region is typified by large seasonal temperature differences, with warm to hot (and often humid) summers and cold (sometimes severely cold) winters.  According to the Köppen Climate Classification system, Eaton Rapids has a humid continental climate, abbreviated "Dfb" on climate maps.

References

External links

 Government
 

 General information
 Eaton Rapids Area Chamber of Commerce
 Veterans of Foreign Wars National Home for Children at Eaton Rapids, Michigan

1835 establishments in Michigan Territory
Cities in Eaton County, Michigan
Lansing–East Lansing metropolitan area
Populated places established in 1835
Populated riverside places in the United States